The labyrinthine artery (auditory artery, internal auditory artery) is a branch of either the anterior inferior cerebellar artery or the basilar artery. It accompanies the vestibulocochlear nerve (CN VIII) through the internal acoustic meatus. It supplies blood to the internal ear.

Structure 
The labyrinthine artery is a branch of either the anterior inferior cerebellar artery (AICA) or the basilar artery. It accompanies the vestibulocochlear nerve (CN VIII) through the internal acoustic meatus. It divides into a cochlear branch and a labyrinthine (or anterior vestibular) branch.

Function 
The labyrinthine artery supplies blood to the inner ear. It also supplies the vestibulocochlear nerve (CN VIII) along its length.

Clinical significance 
The labyrinthine artery may become occluded. This can cause loss of hearing and balance on the affected side.

History 
The labyrinthine artery may also be known as the internal auditory artery or the auditory artery.

See also 

 Internal auditory veins

References

External links 
 

Arteries of the head and neck